Spilarctia accensa is a moth in the family Erebidae. It was described by Charles Swinhoe in 1903. It is found on Sumatra on Malacca.

References

Moths described in 1903
accensa